Zeiraphera virinea is a species of moth of the family Tortricidae. It is found in China (Jilin, Henan, Hunan, Sichuan, Guizhou), Korea, Japan and Russia.

The wingspan is 15–19 mm.

The larvae feed on Viburnum sargentii.

References

Moths described in 1965
Eucosmini